Lewistown station is an Amtrak railway station located about 60 miles northwest of Harrisburg, Pennsylvania at PA 103 and Helen Street in Lewistown, Mifflin County, Pennsylvania. The station is actually located across the Juniata River from Lewistown proper, a little less than one mile south of the center of the borough. It is currently only served by Amtrak's Pennsylvanian, which operates once per day in each direction, though until 2005, Lewistown was served by a second daily train, the Three Rivers (a replacement service for the legendary Broadway Limited), an extended version of the Pennsylvanian that terminated in Chicago. Upon its cancellation, the sole Pennsylvanian marked the first time in Lewistown's railway history that the town was served by just a single, daily passenger train.

A station building exists at the stop, which is open before and during train departure times. However, there is no ticket office at this station, as Amtrak closed the ticket office in 1977. The distance between Lewistown and the next station eastward, the Harrisburg Transportation Center, is the longest distance between stations (61 miles) anywhere along the route between Pittsburgh and New York.

The station house, according to volunteers that staff it, is the oldest structure built by the Pennsylvania Railroad which is still standing. The current passenger depot was constructed in 1849 as the freight station, while the Pennsylvania used a nearby three story hotel building as the passenger depot until 1868. Operations were moved into the freight station, while the old brick building became a hotel, restaurant, and a Railway Express Agency. That building was demolished in the 1950s, and currently sits as a small lot. "J" Tower, which was added in the 1870s as a two story-brick tower within the depot, was removed in the 1950s, During restoration of the depot, a replica of "J" Tower was installed into the building.

In December 2019, the Mifflin County Planning Commission announced a two-phase transportation study on the improvements needed to the station and infrastructure, and the transportation and traffic flow. This would be a first step toward possibly reopening Amtrak service to Lewistown on the Keystone Corridor.

Notes

Track numbers: 1 (Amtrak), 2 (Norfolk Southern)

Image gallery

References

Bibliography

External links 

Lewistown Amtrak Station (USA RailGuide -- TrainWeb)
Pennsylvania Railroad Technical & Historical Society (PRRT&HS)

Amtrak stations in Pennsylvania
Stations on the Pittsburgh Line
Transportation buildings and structures in Mifflin County, Pennsylvania